The 1941 Swedish Ice Hockey Championship was the 19th season of the Swedish Ice Hockey Championship, the national championship of Sweden. Sodertalje SK won the championship.

Tournament

First round
 IFK Lidingö - Horntulls IF 5:1
 Skuru IK - Rålambshofs IF 2:0
 IF Verdandi - IK Westmannia 4:1
 Västerås SK - IF Aros 3:2
 Surahammars IF - Stockholms IF 0:0/1:3
 IK Sleipner - UoIF Matteuspojkarna 1:9
 IFK Norrköping - Nacka SK 1:2
 Södertälje IF - Liljanshofs IF 1:3
 Tranebergs IF - Älvsjö AIK 8:1
 IF Vesta - IF Linnéa 4:2
 IK Huge - Sandvikens IF 3:2
 IK Sirius - Reymersholms IK 3:2

Second round 
 IF Verdandi - IK Sture 1:2
 IK Huge - Tranebergs IF 3:2
 IFK Mariefred - IFK Lidingö 2:1
 Skuru IK - Stockholms IF 1:2

1/8 Finals
 IK Göta - IK Sture 6:2
 Karlbergs BK - IK Hermes 3:0
 IF Vesta - Stockholms IF 4:2
 IK Huge - Hammarby IF 0:6
 AIK - Nacka SK 3:1
 IK Sirius - UoIF Matteuspojkarna 2:3
 Södertälje SK - IFK Mariefred 6:0
 Västerås SK - Liljanshofs IF 6:3

Quarterfinals 
 IK Göta - Karlbergs BK 4:2
 IF Vesta - Hammarby IF 0:5
 AIK - UoIF Matteuspojkarna 1:1/4:1
 Södertälje SK - Västerås SK 5:2

Semifinals 
 IK Göta - Hammarby IF 2:1
 AIK - Södertälje SK 1:2

Final 
 IK Göta - Södertälje SK 2:3 n.V.

External links
 Season on hockeyarchives.info

Cham
Swedish Ice Hockey Championship seasons